Kruklanki  is a village in Giżycko County, Warmian-Masurian Voivodeship, in northern Poland. It is the seat of the gmina (administrative district) called Gmina Kruklanki. 

The village has a population of 1,100.

References

Kruklanki